The London Borough of Hammersmith & Fulham, an Inner London borough, has 231 hectares of parks and open spaces that are accessible to the general public, 159 hectares being within parks and 52.5 hectares within cemeteries and churchyards.   Wormwood Scrubs and Scrubs Wood, located in the north of the Borough account for 42 hectares  and Fulham Palace and Bishop's Park grounds contain another 14 hectares of open space. Private open space includes Hurlingham, Fulham and Queen's Club in West Kensington.

The main areas of open space in the Borough are:
 All Saints Churchyard, Fulham
 Bishops Park, Fulham
 Brompton Park in Seagrave Road, Fulham
 Brook Green
 Eel Brook Common
 Frank Banfield Park (formerly Chancellor's Park)
 Fulham Cemetery also known as Fulham Palace Road cemetery
 Furnival Gardens
 Hammersmith Park
 Hurlingham Park
 Lillie Rec
 Little Wormwood Scrubs
 Margravine Cemetery previously known as Hammersmith Cemetery
 Norland North open space, Shepherd's Bush
 Normand Park in Lillie Road
 Parsons Green
 Pineapple Park in Sands End
 Ravenscourt Park
 St Mary's RC Cemetery, College Park
 St Paul's Green, Hammersmith
 St Peter's Square, Hammersmith
 St Thomas of Canterbury churchyard, Rylston Road, Fulham
 Shepherd's Bush Green (also known as Shepherd's Bush Common)
 South Park, Fulham
 Thames walkway between Craven Cottage and Hammersmith Bridge
 Wendell Park
 Wormholt Park
 Wormwood Scrubs, the borough's only Local Nature Reserve

and two Thames riverside developments, under creation at:
 Imperial Wharf, Fulham
 Hammersmith Embankment

External links

 https://www.lbhf.gov.uk/arts-and-parks/parks-and-open-spaces/

References

 
Fulham
Hammersmith
History of the London Borough of Hammersmith and Fulham